Math metal may refer to:
Mathcore, a dissonant fusion of extreme metal and hardcore punk characterized by the use of odd time signatures and rhythmic patterns
Math rock, a style of rock characterized by the use of odd time signatures and rhythmic patterns
Djent, a style of progressive metal, named for an onomatopoeia for the distinctive high-gain, distorted, palm-muted, low-pitch guitar sound